Domenico Maggiotto or Domenico Fedeli (1713–1794) was an Italian painter and engraver of the late-Baroque period.
He was one of the main pupils of Giovanni Battista Piazzetta. His son Francesco Maggiotto was also a painter.

He lived and worked mainly in Venice.

References

External links
Italian Paintings, Venetian School, a collection catalog containing information about Maggiotto and his works (see index; plate 46).

1713 births
1794 deaths
18th-century Italian painters
Italian male painters
Italian Baroque painters
Painters from Venice
18th-century Italian male artists